Luther Rector Hare (August 24, 1851 – December 22, 1929) was an officer in the 7th U.S. Cavalry, best known for participating in the Battle of the Little Big Horn.

Hare was born in Greencastle, Indiana to Silas Hare and his wife Octavia Elizabeth Rector. His family moved to Texas in 1853. He entered West Point in 1870 and graduated 17 June 1874, joining the 7th Cavalry later that year. By the time of the Great Sioux War, he was a second lieutenant in Company K (Lt Godfrey Commanding), serving in the battalion commanded by Capt. Frederick Benteen.

During the June 1876 expedition to the Little Bighorn River, Lieutenant Hare was on detached service assisting Lt. Charles Varnum with the Indian scouts, being appointed assistant on the evening of the 24th of June. During the siege on Reno's Hill, he served as Maj. Marcus Reno's adjutant, since Lt. Benjamin Hodgson had been killed during the retreat from the woods. Hare later gave testimony at the subsequent Reno Court of Inquiry in 1879.

Hare participated in the Nez Perce War (1877), Spanish–American War (Philippines Theater), and Philippine American War, notably in the recovery of captured US forces following the Battle of Pulang Lupa. He retired on medical disability in July 1903, but served several stints on active duty after that, retiring for the final time in February 1919.

Luther Hare died at Walter Reed Hospital in Washington, D.C., and was buried at Arlington National Cemetery, in Arlington, Virginia.

Notes

References

External links

 

1851 births
1929 deaths
People from Greencastle, Indiana
People of the Great Sioux War of 1876
United States Army officers
United States Military Academy alumni
People from Indiana in the Spanish–American War
American military personnel of the Spanish–American War
Burials at Arlington National Cemetery
Battle of the Little Bighorn